The second election to Tayside Regional Council was held on 2 May 1978 as part of the wider 1978 Scottish regional elections. The election saw the Conservatives maintain their control of the region, gaining an absolute majority. Following the election, the Conservative former Lord Provost of Dundee, William K. Fitzgerald, became convener of the council.

Aggregate results

Ward results

References

Tayside
1978